Next Stop Hollywood is an Australian observational documentary television series directed by Gary Doust and produced by Matchbox Pictures. It follows six ambitious Australian actors competing for roles in Los Angeles during the frenzied TV pilot season. The six-part series was screened on ABC1 in 2013.

Cast
 Alycia Debnam-Carey, 18
 HaiHa Le, 29 
 Penelope Mitchell, 22
 Michael Clarke-Tokely, 22 
 Craig Anderson, 35 
 Luke Pegler, 30

Episodes
 Episode 1–8 January 2013
The excitement, frustrations, fears and tears as six actors – Alycia, HaiHa, Penny, Craig, Luke and Michael - set off from Australia.

 Episode 2–15 January 2013
Alycia scores two major auditions after only two weeks in Hollywood.

 Episode 3–22 January 2013
It’s week three in LA. Penelope gets a Hollywood agent and is in the running for a role in a major feature film.

 Episode 4–29 January 2013
A month into pilot season and things are heating up for Alycia.

 Episode 5–5 February 2013
Alycia goes to Canada to meet a film director. Luke realises he needs to re-focus.

 Episode 6–12 February 2013
It is the final week of pilot season for the cast and this coincides with Hollywood's night-of-nights - the Oscars.

References

External links
Next Stop Hollywood official website (ABC TV)

Australian Broadcasting Corporation original programming
Documentary television series
2013 Australian television series debuts
2013 Australian television series endings
Television series by Matchbox Pictures